Below is a list of people who are known for their association with Lahore. It does not necessarily mean that they were born in the city or were even nationals of the country.

Historical
 Masud Sa'd Salman
 Abu-al-Faraj Runi
 Nur Jahan 
 Ustad Ahmad Lahori
 Wazir Khan

Rulers
 Jahangir ,  Mughal Emperor ,  buried near Lahore 
 Shah Jahan, Mughal Emperor 
 Maharaja Ranjit Singh ,  first ruler and founder of the Sikh Empire of the Punjab 
 Kharak Singh,  Maharaja of Sikh Empire 
 Nau Nihal Singh,  Maharaja of Sikh Empire 
 Duleep Singh,  Maharaja of Sikh Empire

Actors and filmmakers

Artists
 Abdur Rahman Chughtai
 Ajaz Anwar
 Amrita Sher-Gil
 Anna Molka Ahmed
 Bhai Ram Singh, architect
 Nayyar Ali Dada, architect
 Rashid Rana, artist
 Salima Hashmi
 Shakir Ali, artist, art teacher, former head of the National College of Arts in Lahore
 Shahzia Sikander, artist
 Sir Ganga Ram, philanthropist, architect, civil engineer, and agriculturist 
 Zahoor ul Akhlaq

Businessmen
 Michael Chowdry, businessman
 Shahid Khan, richest person of Pakistani birth
 Mian Muhammad Mansha
 Syed Babar Ali

Economists
 Salman Shah, economist
 Shahid Javed Burki
 Ishrat Hussain

Lawyers
 Justice Sir Mian Shah Din ,  the first Muslim judge of the Punjab Chief Court 
 Akhtar Aly Kureshy
 Akram Sheikh
 Ahmad Awais
 Asrar-ul-Haq Mian
 S M Zafar 
 Asma Jahangir
 Allah Bukhsh Karim Bukhsh Brohi
 Aitzaz Ahsan, barrister of Gray's Inn 
 Abdul Ghafoor Bhurgri
 Fakhruddin G. Ebrahim
 Babar Awan
 Hamid Khan
 Syed Ali Zafar 
 Ashtar Ausaf Ali 
 Khalid Ranjha
 Liaqat Ali Khan, barrister of Inner Temple
 Latif Khosa
 Muhammad Ali Jinnah, barrister of Lincoln's Inn
 Mumtaz Mustafa
 Mahmud Ali Kasuri
 Mirza Aziz Akbar Baig
 Rana Mashood Ahmad Khan
 Rana Muhammad Akram Khan
 Rana Arif Kamal Noon
 Rashid Rehman
 Shakeel ur Rahman Khan
 Syed Sharifuddin Pirzada, barrister of Lincoln's Inn.
 Sahibzada Ahmed Raza Khan Kasuri
 Wasim Sajjad Dhanish
 Zafar Mehmood Mughal
 Zulfikar Ali Bhutto, barrister of Lincoln's Inn
 Salman Aslam Butt

Sportspersons
 Aisam-ul-Haq Qureshi, tennis player
 Muhammad Ahmed, footballer
Rehan Butt, hockey player
 The Great Gama
 Zubair Jhara, wrestler

Cricketers
 Aamer Sohail
 Abdul Hafeez Kardar, Pakistan's first official cricket captain
 Abdul Qadir
 Abdul Razzaq
 Abid Ali
 Adnan Akmal
 Ahmed Shehzad
 Ali Naqvi
 Anam Amin
 Asif Masood
 Ata-ur-Rehman
 Azhar Ali
 Babar Azam
 Bismah Maroof
 Fazal Mahmood
 Gul Mohammad
 Humayun Farhat
 Ijaz Ahmed
 Ikramullah Sheikh
 Imam-ul-Haq
 Imran Butt
 Imran Farhat
 Imran Khan 
 Imtiaz Ahmed
 Kamran Akmal
 Khan Mohammad
 Mahmood Hussain
 Mohammad Hussain
 Mohammad Khalil
 Mohammad Yousuf
 Mudassar Nazar
 Nashra Sandhu
 Nasir Jamshed
 Saad Nasim
 Saleem Altaf
 Saleem Malik
 Salman Butt
 Sami Aslam
 Saqlain Mushtaq
 Sarfraz Nawaz
 Shafiq Ahmed
 Sidra Nawaz
 Taufeeq Umar
 Umer Akmal
 Usman Salahuddin
 Usman Qadir
 Wahab Riaz
 Waqar Hasan
 Wasim Akram
 Waqar Younis 
 Zafar Gohar
 Zulqarnain Haider

Journalists
 Ahmed Rashid
 Agha Shorish Kashmiri
 Janbaz Mirza
 Kamran Shahid
 Khushwant Singh, novelist and journalist
 Muhammad Farooq
 Mazhar Ali Khan,  Socialist journalist 
 Hamid Mir
 Hassan Nisar, columnist and anchor person
 Naeem Baig, novelist and short story writer.
 Olive Christian Malvery, investigative journalist.
 Sohail Warraich
 Arif Nizami, Pakistan Today

Medical professionals
Amna Buttar - medical doctor
Farid Ahmad Khan - Pakistani doctor and plastic surgeon who served as Chairman and Dean of Shaikh Zayed Medical Complex from 2015-2018, and Registrar of King Edward Medical University from 2011-2015.

Music and Dance
 Abrar ul Haq
 Ali Azmat
 Ali Zafar
 Amanat Ali Khan
 Annie Khalid
 Meesha Shafi
 Asad Amanat Ali Khan
 Atif Aslam
 Bilal Khan, singer
 Farida Khanum
 Ghulam Ahmed Chishti 
 Humera Arshad
 Inayat Hussain, composer 
 Iqbal Bahu
 Iqbal Bano
 Irene Perveen
 Jawad Ahmad
 Khwaja Khurshid Anwar 
 Maharaj Ghulam Hussain Kathak 
 Malika Pukhraj
 Musarrat Nazir
 Noor Jehan (Madam) 
 Nusrat Fateh Ali Khan
 O. P. Nayyar, film music director and composer
 Rashid Attre ,  film music director and composer 
 Shafqat Amanat Ali
 Shamshad Begum
 Shiraz Uppal, singer and songwriter
 Tahira Syed
 Waris Baig
 Sahir Ali Bagga
 Saieen Zahoor , Sufi singer and dancer 
 Zayn Malik, British singer-songwriter of Pakistani descent whose father is from Lahore.

Politicians and Government Officers
 Fakir Syed Azizuddin ,  minister during Sikh rule 
 Mumtaz Daultana ,  Punjabi politician 
 Sir Shahnawaz Khan Mamdot ,  Muslim League leader and politician 
 Sir Mian Muhammad Shafi ,  early politician from Punjab 
 Begum Jahanara Shahnawaz ,  Muslim League lady activist 
 Syed Amjad Ali ,  senior politician and former Finance Minister of Pakistan 
Qamar Zaman Kaira
Moonis Elahi
Chaudhry Tahir Mahmood Chahal Jatt
 Aitizaz Ahsan
 Hafiz Muhammad Saeed, amir of Jama'at-ud-Da'wah
 Imran Khan, former Prime Minister of Pakistan, Chairman Pakistan Tehreek-e-Insaf – former cricketer 
 Khawaja Saad Rafique
 Maleeha Lodhi
 Malik Ghulam Muhammad, Governor-General of Pakistan from 1951 until 1955
 Naeem Bokhari, Pakistani TV personality and a Senior Advocate Supreme Court
 Master Taj-uj-Din Ansari (leader of Majlis-e-Ahrar)
 Sheikh Hissam-ud-Din (leader of Majlis-e-Ahrar)
 Mazhar Ali Azhar (Founder of Majlis-e-Ahrar-ul-Islam), Member of the Legislative Assembly
 Nawabzada Nasrullah Khan (Secretary General Majlis-e-Ahrar-e-Islam, 1945)
 Nawaz Sharif, Former Prime Minister of Pakistan, leader of the Pakistan Muslim League (N)
 Princess Sarvath El Hassan (resident), Crown Princess of Jordan for over 30 years, wife of Prince Hassan bin Talal of Jordan
 Raza Rabbani
 Shahbaz Sharif
 Abdul Sattar Ranjoor, politician who lived briefly in Lahore

Scholars
 Gottlieb Wilhelm Leitner ,  Orientalist scholar and early educationalist of British Punjab 
 Alfred Cooper Woolner, Sanskrit scholar
 John Lockwood Kipling curator, artist and ethnologist, also father of Rudyard Kipling
 Allama Mashriqi, mathematician, political theorist, Islamic scholar, founder of the Khaksar movement
 Alamgir Hashmi, English and Comparative Literature scholar, author, literary editor and scholarly editor (social sciences and humanities)
 Ayesha Jalal, South Asian Historian 
 Ishtiaq Ahmed, Professor Emeritus of Political Science, Stockholm University and Senior Research Fellow at the Institute of South Asian Studies, Singapore, author of prize winning book, The Punjab Bloodied, Partitioned and Cleansed, 2012, 2014
 Muhammad Sharif, Pakistani cosmologist
 Muhammad Tahir ul-Qadri, Founder Minhaj-ul-Quran, religious Scholar, Islamic hadith compiler, Author
 Nergis Mavalvala, Pakistani-American astrophysicist, dean of Massachusetts Institute of Technology (MIT) School of Science
 Israr Ahmed, Pakistani Muslim religious scholar, founder of the Tanzeem-e-Islami
 Syed Jawad Naqvi, Pakistani Religious leader, Islamic scholar, Quranic interpreter and theologian of Twelver Shia.
 Javed Ahmad Ghamidi, Pakistani Muslim theologian, Koran scholar, educationist
 Sara Suleri, author, professor of English at Yale University since 1983
 Subrahmanyan Chandrasekhar, winner of Nobel Prize in Physics, astrophysicist
 Sarfraz Ahmed Naeemi, Founder Jamia Naemia
 Syed Afzal Haider legal expert and scholar of Islamic jurisprudence
Syed Waqar Jaffry Pakistani academic and researcher in the field of computer science and artificial intelligence
 Ghulam Ahmed Pervez, Pakistani Muslim theologian, Koran scholar, Talu-e-Islam
 Asghar Zaidi - Vice Chancellor GCU
 Abdul Hafeez Mirza - Pakistani writer, tourism worker, educationist and cultural activist.

Writers and poets 
 Hakim Ahmad Shuja, poet, dramatist, writer and scholar
 Chaudhry Afzal Haq (writer, politician, historian, Novelist)
 Abdul Hameed, Urdu fiction writer
 Agha Shorish Kashmiri (writer, historian)
 Muhammad Asim Butt (Urdu novelist, short story writer, translator, researcher, editor, critic and journalist)
 Janbaz Mirza (writer, historian)
 Wasif Ali Wasif (conversationalist, writer, Sufism)
 Amjad Islam Amjad writer, poet and teacher
 Amrita Pritam, woman Punjabi poet, novelist, and essayist
 Ashfaq Ahmed, writer, playwright, broadcaster
 Bapsi Sidhwa, novelist in English, author of Cracking India, The Crow Eaters, Ice Candy Man and Water
 Bano Qudsia, novelist, playwright and spiritualist
 Daniyal Mueenuddin
 Enver Sajjad
 Muzaffar Warsi, Urdu poet
 Faiz Ahmed Faiz, poet in Urdu, Lenin Peace Prize recipient
 Habib Jalib
 Imtiaz Dharker
 Khalil-ur-Rehman Qamar
 Krishan Chander
 Masud Sa'd Salman Persian poet from the Ghaznavid period
 Moeen Nizami Urdu and Persian writer, poet, and scholar
 Moniza Alvi
 Mohsin Hamid
 Muneer Niazi
 Qasim Mahmood
 Muhammad Iqbal, philosopher, politician, poet
 Rudyard Kipling, English short-story writer, poet, novelist (resided in Lahore)
 Alamgir Hashmi, English poet, essayist, fiction writer (born in Lahore)
 Saadat Hasan Manto, short story writer in Urdu
 Qayyum Nazar, Urdu Language poet
 Khadija Mastoor, Urdu feminist writer
 Hajra Masroor, Urdu feminist writer
 Ali Arshad Mir, Punjabi poet and writer
 Vijay Kumar Chopra Writer
 Tariq Ali ,  British-Pakistani writer and Communist 
 Muhammad Asim Butt, Urdu novelist and translator
 Amjad Islam Amjad

Others 
 Ali Hujwiri,  Data Ganj-Baksh,  patron Sufi saint of Lahore 
 Mian Mir,  Qadiri Sufi saint 
 Madho Lal Hussain (Shah Hussain),  Sufi poet 
 Bamba Sutherland, last Sikh princess of the Punjab 
 Kamran Lashari 
 Ayesha Mumtaz, PCS officer
 Tahira Mazhar Ali , women's rights and political activist 
 Pappu Samrat, choreographer
 Guru Ram Das, 4th Sikh Guru
 Yousuf Salahuddin, socialite, philanthropist, ex-politician
 Laeeq Ahmed (1933–2014), commentator, broadcaster, television presenter
 Anarkali,  quasi-legendary Mughal concubine and aesthetic muse,  after whom the Anarkali Bazaar is also named 

Lahore

Lahore-related lists